The Munot is a circular 16th century fortification in the center of the Swiss city of Schaffhausen. It is surrounded by vineyards and serves as the city's symbol. The ring-shaped fortress was built in the 16th century. Today, it is a tourist attraction and hosts various events.

Earliest presence of a castle dates to 1379.

The current complex was built between 1564 and 1589 under the city master builder Heinrich Schwarz (1526–1593), probably to the knowledge of Albrecht Dürer's work of a circular fortification.

It is one of the few examples of the transition from a castle to a modern Fortress. The Munot was part of the city fortifications. The construction cost the city 47,528 guilders, which corresponded to the construction costs of around 800 townhouses.

References

External links

 Images of the Munot
 Images, with short history in French

Castles in the canton of Schaffhausen
Tourist attractions in the canton of Schaffhausen